Yerfi is a village and municipality in the Quba Rayon of Azerbaijan.  It has a population of 915.  The municipality consists of the villages of Yerfi, Talış, Dərk, Qayadalı, and Nohurdüzü.

References

External links

Populated places in Quba District (Azerbaijan)